Evan G. Greenberg (born 1955) is an American business executive. He is the President and Chief Executive Officer (CEO) of the Zurich-based insurance company Chubb Limited (formerly ACE Limited). He also serves as Chairman Emeritus of the US-ASEAN Business Council.

Early life and education
Greenberg is the son of Corinne Phyllis Zuckerman and Maurice R. Greenberg, the former chairman and CEO of American International Group (AIG). He is also the younger brother of the former CEO of Marsh & McLennan, Jeffrey W. Greenberg.

Evan Greenberg attended New York University and the College of Insurance (now part of St. John's University, New York) but did not graduate from either.

Career
Greenberg joined AIG in 1975 and worked under his father for 25 years. He held a number of senior management positions, including president and CEO of AIU Holdings, AIG’s foreign insurance organization, as well as CEO of AIG Far East, where he was based in Japan and Korea. Between 1997 and 2000 he served as AIG’s president and chief operating officer. He was considered to be the heir apparent to take over as CEO, but left the company in 2000 and joined ACE in November 2001 as its vice chairman. He became the CEO of ACE in 2004. In the 2008 financial crisis, he was among the CEOs refusing to take part in a tax-payer funded bailout. In February 2011, it was announced that Greenberg was named as a director of The Coca-Cola Company.

Greenberg also serves on the board of the National Committee on United States-China Relations, as well as the US-China Business Council. He is a member of the Council on Foreign Relations, the Center for the National Interest, as well as the Business Roundtable. Additionally, he is an overseer of the International Rescue Committee.

References

1955 births
Living people
American chief executives of financial services companies
20th-century American Jews
Peterson Institute for International Economics
21st-century American Jews